Södertälje Hamn ("Harbour") (previously Södertälje södra) is a railway station along Sweden's Western Main Line (Västra stambanan) in Södertälje.

Before Grödingebanan was constructed Södertälje hamn (then Södertälje södra) was the regional train station in Södertälje. Today it is only used by Stockholm commuter rail.

Passenger traffic 
As there are no direct tracks between Stockholm and Södertälje centrum, all commuter trains between these stations reverse in Södertälje hamn.

There are three commuter rail lines through Södertälje hamn. J40 and J41 go from Södertälje centrum via Stockholm City Station to Uppsala and Märsta respectively. J48 goes from Södertälje centrum to Gnesta.

References

Södertälje Municipality
Railway stations in Stockholm County
Railway stations opened in 1921
1921 establishments in Sweden